Rosina Martha Hosanah Palmer (27 August 1844 – 16 June 1932) was an Australian opera singer. Born in Hobart, she developed a soprano voice early on and accompanied her mother, opera singer Marie Carandini, on tours, singing with her family troupe. Palmer moved to Melbourne with her husband in 1866. Although she had a low income, she later became a successful singing teacher. Musicologist Thérèse Radic wrote that although she was gifted, Palmer was constrained by her social position as a married woman, as was typical of her contemporaries.

Biography

Early life and career 
Rosina Martha Carandini was born on 27 August 1844 in Hobart. She was the eldest of the five daughters of Jerome Carandini, Marquis of Sarzano, and Marie Carandini . As her father had no money, the family was dependent on their mother's career as an opera singer. Educated in Sydney and Melbourne, Rosina showed early promise in piano and placed first in school pianoforte competitions. Under the tuition of Frederick Augustus Packer, she developed a soprano voice. Her debut appearance was at St. Joseph's Cathedral in Hobart.

Rosina's mother was determined and, after Rosina appeared beside her in the opera Norma as Adalgisa when she was fourteen, her mother encouraged her only in singing. 

Rosina married accountant Edward Hodson Palmer on 8 November 1860, with whom she would have eight children. She initially had no interest pursuing a career in music and only appeared at charity concerts, but joined her mother's concert company on an extended tour of Australia, New Zealand, India and the United States as "circumstances [rendered] it necessary". Four of her sisters joined in later years and they were known as the Carandini Family Troupe, until their father's death led to their mother abandoning the European tour in 1870.

Career in Melbourne 
When Palmer and her husband moved to Melbourne in 1866, she continued her career as a singer, but did concerts in major cities instead of tours and was an oratorio singer. Palmer sang solo parts with low pay in the Melbourne Philharmonic Society and the Liedertafels, as they were socially acceptable as opposed to a "respectable matron [appearing] on the always-suspect opera stage". When Alfred, Duke of Edinburgh, visited Melbourne he was impressed by Palmer's performance and promised to provide her musical education, but this did not come to pass.

Palmer joined a traveling quartet as soprano with Armes Beaumont, S. Lamble and Mrs. Cutter in 1872 and they toured Australia and visited New Zealand. She and Beaumont were also the main singers in a series of concerts at the Royal Exhibition Building and she was a soloist on the Scots' Church choir from 1880–1910. Although her income was small, she was able to continue singing because her husband's was slightly larger.

Later career and death 
Palmer later became a successful singing teacher and was praised by celebrities she sang with, such as Charles Santley. Although she visited the United States, she had to return to Melbourne as her mother had fallen ill. To her disappointment, Palmer also had to give up teaching some years before her death.

Her husband died 28 June 1928, before she died herself on 16 June 1932 in South Yarra. Palmer was survived by a son and two daughters, one of which was Brisbane soprano Mrs. Gilbert Wilson. In her entry for Palmer in the Australian Dictionary of Biography, musicologist Thérèse Radic said that although Palmer was undoubtedly gifted, the demands of her place in society as a married woman barred her from further development like many of her contemporaries and, unlike her mother, Palmer could not "successfully break through the barricades of convention". Caradini's niece was the writer Mary Gaunt.

References

Further reading 

 

1844 births
1932 deaths
Australian people of English descent
Australian operatic sopranos
Carandini family
People from Hobart
19th-century Australian women opera singers